Peddapuram revenue division (or Peddapuram division) is an administrative division in the Kakinada district of the Indian state of Andhra Pradesh. It is one of the 2 revenue divisions in the district which consists of 11 mandals under its administration. Peddapuram is the divisional headquarters.

Administration 
There are 11 mandals in Peddapuram revenue division.

See also 
List of revenue divisions in Andhra Pradesh
List of mandals in Andhra Pradesh

References 

Revenue divisions in Kakinada district